Thout 7 - Coptic Calendar - Thout 9

The eighth day of the Coptic month of Thout, the first month of the Coptic year. On a common year, this day corresponds to September 5, of the Julian Calendar, and September 18, of the Gregorian Calendar.  It falls in the Coptic season of Akhet, the season of inundation.

Commemorations

Feasts 

 Coptic New Year Period

Saints 
 The departure of Moses the Prophet
 The departure of Zacharias the Priest
 The Martyrdom of Saint Dimides, the Presbyter

References 

Days of the Coptic calendar